Cédric Forgit (born 23 February 1982 in Cognac) is a French slalom canoeist who competed at the international level from 1998 to 2008.

Forgit won a silver medal in the C2 team event at the 2007 ICF Canoe Slalom World Championships. He also won five medals at the European Championships (1 gold, 3 silvers and 1 bronze).

Forgit finished fourth in the C2 event at the 2008 Summer Olympics in Beijing.

His partner in the C2 boat throughout his active career was Martin Braud.

World Cup individual podiums

1 European Championship counting for World Cup points
2 Pan American Championship counting for World Cup points

References

1982 births
Living people
People from Cognac, France
Canoeists at the 2008 Summer Olympics
French male canoeists
Olympic canoeists of France
Sportspeople from Charente
Medalists at the ICF Canoe Slalom World Championships